Samuel Poulin (born February 25, 2001) is a Canadian professional ice hockey forward for the Wilkes-Barre/Scranton Penguins of the American Hockey League (AHL) as a prospect to the Pittsburgh Penguins of the National Hockey League (NHL). He was drafted 21st overall by the Penguins in the first round of the 2019 NHL Entry Draft.

Playing career
Poulin was drafted 21st overall by the Pittsburgh Penguins in the first round of the 2019 NHL Entry Draft. He signed a three-year, entry-level contract with the Penguins on September 22, 2019. Poulin made his NHL debut on October 25, 2022, in a 4–1 loss to the Calgary Flames, and recorded his first NHL point (an assist).

Personal life
Poulin's father, Patrick, was chosen ninth overall by the Hartford Whalers in the 1991 NHL Entry Draft. He would score 101 goals in 634 career NHL games, and would play for the Whalers, Chicago Blackhawks, Tampa Bay Lightning and Montreal Canadiens during his 11-year career spanning from 1991 to 2002.

Poulin's godfather is former Penguins goaltender Jocelyn Thibault, who serves as the general manager of the Sherbrooke Phoenix of the Quebec Major Junior Hockey League (QMJHL).

Career statistics

Regular season and playoffs

International

References

External links
 

2001 births
Living people
Canadian ice hockey forwards
Ice hockey people from Quebec
National Hockey League first-round draft picks
People from Blainville, Quebec
Pittsburgh Penguins draft picks
Pittsburgh Penguins players
Sherbrooke Phoenix players
Val-d'Or Foreurs players
Wilkes-Barre/Scranton Penguins players